I-CON (short for "Island CONvention") was a (roughly) annual fan convention, held on various college campuses in Suffolk County, Long Island, New York. First held in 1982 on the campus of Stony Brook University, I-CON became a very eclectic convention. The programming included things normally found at different types of convention, like speeches by and talks with science fiction authors, extensive gaming, anime fandom, comics fandom, furry fandom, multiple movie showings, and medieval programming, as well as live performances. There was also a science track discussing recent developments in various branches of science and exploring the real science behind science fiction technologies. I-CON was jointly held by ICON Science Fiction, Inc., a tax-exempt educational foundation, and the I-CON Campus Chapter of Stony Brook.

History
I-CON was preceded by SUNYcon (April 14, 1973), Mudcon (May 8, 1977), and Brookcon (October 28–30, 1977), held on the Stony Brook campus.

I-CON was held annually from 1983 through 2012 at Stony Brook University, except for 2009, when it relocated temporarily to the Brentwood campus of Suffolk County Community College, due to planned construction at Stony Brook University.

In the spring of 2012, I-CON was informed that the Stony Brook Sports Complex would be unavailable due to construction in 2013. ICON Science Fiction, Inc. scouted several possible locations on Long Island as an alternative venue, eventually entering into an agreement with Hofstra University. Due to many compounding issues including finances and delays caused by Hurricane Sandy, the board decided to postpone I-CON 32, with plans to raise funds via smaller events and return in 2014, but made no announcements about future dates.

I-CON ran smaller conventions, LI-CON, in 2014 and 2015, at other venues on Long Island.

I-CON 32 occurred on March 17–19, 2017, at Suffolk County Community College, Grant Campus, Brentwood, New York.

The website was updated February 14, 2019 to announce a trip to a library exhibit, having previously been last updated on August 11, 2016.

Event history

LI-CON

References

External links

Defunct science fiction conventions in the United States
Defunct multigenre conventions